Richard Kilmer (born Hemet, California, 1969) is a technology entrepreneur, software programmer and conference host and speaker in the open-source software community.  He is an open-source contributor and developer of commercial software applications built in Ruby and Flash.  His best known open-source software creation is of RubyGems, a package manager for the Ruby programming language most commonly used in downloads and deployments of the Ruby on Rails web application framework.  He is currently the Co-Founder and CEO of CargoSense, Inc.

In 2001, he co-founded both the non-profit corporation Ruby Central, Inc. dedicated to the promotion of the Ruby programming language, and the for-profit corporation InfoEther, Inc., created to focus on applying the Ruby computer language in business.  He served as president and CEO of InfoEther until its acquisition by LivingSocial in March 2011.  At LivingSocial he was appointed a vice president working in roles in R&D, and led the software development of numerous projects in Merchant Services and mobile.

Prior to 2001, he was the co-founder and Chief Technology Officer for a leading-edge P2P software company where he was granted two U.S. patents and co-wrote a massive Java codebase.

Between 2002 and 2005 his for-profit company performed work for DARPA on both a massively multi-agent logistics software system and the Semantic Web project developing an early Ontological Web Language (OWL) library.  Both projects drew on his expertise in computer security gained as a systems security manager while in the U.S. Air Force stationed at The Pentagon.

When an active board member in the non-profit Ruby Central, he played host to the annual international conferences put on by that organization for both Ruby and Ruby on Rails.  By 2006, the Ruby on Rails conferences had become so large and popular that Ruby Central entered into an agreement with O'Reilly Media to co-promote Rails events in both the U.S. and Europe.  Previously Rich had spoken at numerous O'Reilly Media open-source conferences.  He has also been a consistent contributor at the Foo Camp events put on by O'Reilly Media and is a technology blogger.

References

External links
 CargoSense, Inc.
 Ruby Central, Inc.
 Rails Conferences
 Rich Kilmer video interview on the Power of Ruby

1969 births
Living people
Computer programmers
American chief technology officers
American technology chief executives